The Sculptured House, also known as the Sleeper House, is a distinctive elliptical curved house built in Genesee, Jefferson County, Colorado, on Genesee Mountain in 1963 by architect Charles Deaton. It is featured prominently in the 1973 Woody Allen sci-fi comedy Sleeper.

Background
Architect Charles Deaton has described his inspiration for the house: "On Genesee Mountain I found a high point of land where I could stand and feel the great reaches of the Earth. I wanted the shape of it to sing an unencumbered song."

Construction
The Deaton-designed house was built in 1963. Delzell Inc., owned and operated by Clifford M. Delzell, was the original builder of the house on an experimental permit. Deaton ran out of money before the house was finished, so it was never inhabited by the designer.

The interior of the Sculptured House went largely unfinished and was vacant for almost three decades. Deaton died in 1996. In 1999, entrepreneur and one-time Denver economic-development chief John Huggins purchased the house. He built a large addition designed by Deaton with Nick Antonopoulos. Huggins commissioned Deaton's daughter Charlee to design the interior, and it was completed in 2003.

In 2006, fellow Denver entrepreneur Michael Dunahay purchased the house from Huggins. By late 2010, Dunahay had become delinquent on the nearly $2.8 million outstanding balance of his $3.1 million mortgage on the house, and the Public Trustee in Jefferson County, Colorado scheduled a foreclosure auction for November 10, 2010, where it was sold for $1.5 million. The house was sold again in November 2010.

In the media
 The 21st Century, episode "At Home, 2001" — hosted by Walter Cronkite (CBS, 1967)
Sleeper (Woody Allen film, 1973)
Livin' Large (MTV, 2003)
American Guns (Discovery, 2011)
Extreme Cribs (MTV, 2011)
Home Strange Home (HGTV, 2012)

See also
National Register of Historic Places listings in Jefferson County, Colorado

References

External links

 Forbes - Sleeper House

History of Colorado
Houses in Jefferson County, Colorado
Houses on the National Register of Historic Places in Colorado
Houses completed in 1963
National Register of Historic Places in Jefferson County, Colorado